Napkin psoriasis, or psoriasis in the diaper area, is characteristically seen in infants between two and eight months of age.

See also
 Psoriasis
 Skin lesion

References

 

Psoriasis
Diapers